Barbara Joy Gloudon OD, OJ, IOJ ( Goodison; 5 February 1935 – 11 May 2022) was a Jamaican writer. She received two Seprod Awards from the Press Association of Jamaica and Order of Distinction. Gloudon was a scriptwriter for Jamaica's Little Theatre Movement (LTM) and wrote radio drama. She hosted a radio talk show for thirty years and became chair of the LTM. She was granted the Order of Jamaica in 1992 and became a fellow of the Institute of Jamaica in 2012.

Early life
Barbara Joy Goodison was the eldest of nine siblings, born in Malvern, Saint Elizabeth Parish, Jamaica, to Doris (née Harvey) and Vivian M. Goodison.  Her father worked as a chauffeur and mechanic and Goodison grew up in a middle-class family.  Barbara attended St. George's Elementary School and went on to further her education at St Andrew High School for Girls in Kingston, as well as completing an international writing studies program at the University of Iowa. While in high school, she participated in theatrical performances and studied drama with Jean Watson. Her sister, Lorna, went on to become the first female Poet Laureate of Jamaica.

Career
In 1953 Goodison began her career at The Gleaner newspaper, working as a reporter, and writing for the paper's social pages under the pseudonym "Kitty Kingston". Simultaneously, she wrote the column "Stella Seh" at the Jamaica Star, where she used Jamaican patois for the first time in a newspaper. 

On 23 April 1960 Goodison married chemist and food technologist Ancile Gloudon, a native of Port of Spain, Trinidad. The couple had three children – Lisa, Jason and Anya. She worked as a features editor, editor and reporter at both The Gleaner and The Star until 1978. In 1964, the inaugural year of the Seprod Awards for Journalism, and again in 1968, Gloudon won recognition from the Press Association of Jamaica. One of the regular beats she covered was the arts and theatre. Showing a particular talent for reporting on the cast, as well as the event, Gloudon was invited by the government to cover the art revolution in Britain in the 1960s.

In 1969 she spent a month in the UK. Greta and Henry Fowler had founded Jamaica's Little Theatre Movement (LTM) and they invited Gloudon to write a script for the annual pantomime production. Marking the moon landing Gloudon wrote Moonshine Anancy, a turning point for LTM's Jamaican-led works. She was honoured as an officer in the Order of Distinction in 1975 for her journalistic services.

Leaving journalism in 1978, Gloudon worked until 1981 as the director of the Jamaica Tourist Board and then opened her own public relations firm. From the late 1980s until 2015 she hosted the radio talk-show, Hotline, broadcast by Radio Jamaica Rediffusion (RJR 94 FM).  In addition to her broadcasting and writing, Gloudon travelled regionally discussing Caribbean themes, and specifically focused on the cultural and socio-economic concerns of women.

In the 1990s Gloudon became the chair of the LTM and directed the annual Boxing Day debut of the National Pantomime. In 1992 Gloudon received the Order of Jamaica, which was recognized at the Caribbean Media Awards ceremony hosted by the Caribbean Publishing and Broadcasting Association and Caribbean Broadcasting Union. She was elected as vice-chair of the International Programme for the Development of Communication (IPDC) in 1996 and served until 1998, when she was elected IPDC's rapporteur. She was re-elected as rapporteur in 2000.

Gloudon was awarded the 2006 Gleaner Honour for her contributions to art and culture. In 2012 she and Sylvia Wynter were elected as fellows of the Institute of Jamaica. Gloudon was inducted into the Jamaican Press Association Hall of Fame in 2013, continuing to write as a journalist for The Jamaica Observer in addition to her role at the LTM.

Death and legacy
Gloudon died on 11 May 2022, aged 87, in Kingston, 11 days after she had been widowed. She is remembered for her long-running talk show, Hotline, and other programmes on Radio Jamaica, her work as a playwright, and her production and writing for the Annual Pantomime programme.

Selected awards and recognition
 1975: Officer in the Order of Distinction in 1975 for her journalistic services
 1992: Order of Jamaica
 2006: Gleaner Honour Award for her contributions to art and culture
 2012: Elected a Fellow of the Institute of Jamaica
 2003: Honorary doctorate from the University of the West Indies
 2013: Inducted into Jamaican Press Association Hall of Fame
 2015: Special Lifetime Achievement Award, for her unparalleled service to journalism, Press Association of Jamaica Awards

Scripts
 1969: Moonshine Anancy
 1972: Hail Columbus
 1975: The Witch
 1978: Johhny Reggae
 1981: The Pirate Princess
 1983: Ginneral B
 1985: Trash
 1986: River Mumma and the Golden Table, in conjunction with Aston Cooke
 1989: Schoolers, based on a scene by Owen Ellis and Michael Nicholson
 1990: Fifty Fifty
 1990: A Carol for Moneybags", an adaptation of Charles Dickens' "A Christmas Carol"
 1991: Man Deh Yah 1992: Reggae Son 1993: Anansi Come Back 1994: Moonsplash 1995: Schoolers 2 1998: Anansi Web 1999: Bugsie the Millennium Bug, in collaboration with Conliffe Wilmot-Simpson
 2001: Chicken Merry—Hawk Deh Near, in collaboration with the Pantomime Workshop
 2002: Miss Annie 2003: Combolo 2004: Iffa Nuh So 2005: Zu-zu Macca 2006: Howzzat 2013: The Golden Macca Fat 2014: Princess Boonoonoonoos 2015: Runeesha and the Birds 2016: The Upsies and Downsies 2017: Dapper DanOther media
1980s: Wrong Move, radio serial drama
1991: 

 References 
Citations

Bibliography

   

 

     
 

 
 
 

 
 
 
 

External links
 Lennox Aldred, "Barbara Gloudon, the name behind pantomime and the carrier of our creative history", Jamaica Gleaner, 4 April 2021.
 Barbara Gloudon at LTM Pantomime.
 "Tributes for Barbara Gloudon, veteran hailed as icon", Jamaica Gleaner, 12 May 2022.
 "10 things to know about Barbara Gloudon", Loop News, 12 May 2022.
 "Barbara Gloudon: 10 things to know about the cultural icon", Jamaica Observer, 12 May 2022.
 "Grange pays tribute to Barbara Gloudon", Jamaica Observer, 12 May 2022.
 Clyde McKenzie, "Memories of Mama G", Jamaica Observer'', 29 May 2022.

1935 births
2022 deaths
20th-century dramatists and playwrights
20th-century Jamaican women writers
21st-century dramatists and playwrights
21st-century Jamaican women writers
International Writing Program alumni
Jamaican dramatists and playwrights
Jamaican journalists
Jamaican radio presenters
Jamaican women radio presenters
Jamaican women dramatists and playwrights
Jamaican women journalists
Members of the Order of Jamaica
Officers of the Order of Distinction
People from Saint Elizabeth Parish
Jamaican columnists
Jamaican women columnists